The Copa Generación was a U-18 youth football league in Peru for the Peruvian football teams in the Liga 1 and Liga 2.

Teams

Stadia and locations

Fase Inicial

Results

Fase Final

Repechajes

Semifinals

Final

References

External links
 Copa Generación

 
Football leagues in Peru
Peruvian Primera División
Peru